Yamanobe may refer to:
Yamanobe, Yamagata, in Japan
Yamanobe Masato, a fictional character